The following is an episode list for the Australian television show The Elephant Princess, which aired on Network Ten. Season 1 premiered in Australia on 13 November 2008, and season two premiered in Canada on 6 February 2011. The series revolves around Alex Wilson, a teenager from suburban Melbourne, Australia, who discovers that she is in fact the heir to the throne of Manjipur, a fictitious kingdom in a parallel world that looks like India.

Series overview

Episodes

Season 1 (2008–09)

Season 2 (2011)

References

External links
 Episode guide at the Internet Movie Database

Lists of Australian drama television series episodes
Lists of Australian children's television series episodes
Lists of fantasy television series episodes
2008 Australian television seasons
2009 Australian television seasons
2011 Australian television seasons